This is the discography for the German rock band Böhse Onkelz. According to record certifications and additional sources they have sold over 5,338,000 records and 425,000 videos/DVDs in their career. E.I.N.S. is their most successful album with over 510,000 units sold. Seven of their albums peaked at number one on the German albums chart. The Onkelz are one of the most bootlegged bands with over 250 bootlegs circulating as of 2005. Their albums spent 311 weeks on the German albums chart.

Albums

Studio albums

Live albums

Compilations

Extended plays

Sampler 
 1982: Soundtracks zum Untergang 2 (Neuer deutscher Punk-Underground)

Singles

Other releases 
 1998: Shape CD (ticket for the 1998 tour)
 2005: Wenn du wirklich willst (played in the last scene and the credits of the film Kombat Sechzehn from Mirko Borscht)

Videography

VHS 
 1985: Böse Menschen – Böse Lieder
 1987: Onkelz wie wir
 1992: Live in Vienna (Ger 2)
 1994: B.O.S.C Fan-Video
 1997: Live in Dortmund (Ger 1)
 2000: Dunkler Ort + Clip – Making of
 2000: Tourfilm 2000 (Ger 1)

DVDs 

 2004: Adios DVD

Music videos

Unauthorised releases

Other releases 
 1986: No Surrender! Vol. 2, 'Rock-o-Rama' (banned in Germany because of songs from the debut album)
 1988: Freitag Nacht, 'Rock-o-Rama'
 1988: Hässlich, 'Rock-o-rama' (banned in Germany because of songs from the debut album)
 1989: Hass / Was kann ich denn dafür, 'Street Rock’n’Roll'
 1989: Stolz / Singen und Tanzen, 'Street Rock’n’Roll'
 1990: 6. für Deutschland, 'Metal Enterprises'
 1992: 6. für Deutschland Vol. II, 'Metal Enterprises'
 1994: Fanatorium
 1995: Digital World (Best of 1991–1993), 'Bellaphon'
 1995: Heilige Lieder GOLD – Limited Edition, 'Bellaphon'
 1998: Buch der Erinnerung, 'Bellaphon'

Record certifications

References

External links
 Official website

 
Rock music group discographies
Discographies of German artists